The 1980 NCAA Division I Tennis Championships were the 35th annual tournaments to determine the national champions of NCAA men's college tennis. Matches were played during May 1980 at the Dan Magill Tennis Complex in Athens, Georgia on the campus of the University of Georgia. A total of three championships were contested: men's team, singles, and doubles.

The men's team championship was won by the Stanford Cardinal, their 5th team national title. Stanford defeated California in the final round, 5–3. The men's singles title was won by Robert Van't Hof from USC, and the men's doubles title went to Mel Purcell and Rodney Harmon of Tennessee.

Team tournament

See also
NCAA Division I Women's Tennis Championship (from 1982)
NCAA Men's Division II Tennis Championship
NCAA Men's Division III Tennis Championship

References

External links
List of NCAA Men's Tennis Champions
List of NCAA Women's Tennis Champions

NCAA Division I tennis championships
NCAA Division I Tennis
NCAA  Division I Tennis Championships
NCAA Division I Tennis Championships